Stoops may refer to:

People
 A set of American brothers who are all current or former college football coaches:
 Bob Stoops (born 1960), former head coach at the University of Oklahoma
 Mark Stoops (born 1967), head coach at the University of Kentucky
 Mike Stoops (born 1961), former defensive coordinator at the University of Oklahoma
 Jim Stoops (born 1972), American baseball pitcher
 Mark Stoops (Indiana), American politician

Other uses
 22594 Stoops, a main-belt asteroid
 Stoops, Kentucky, an unincorporated community
 Stoops Hotel, a historic tavern and hotel in Battenville, New York

See also
 Stoop (disambiguation)